32nd AVN Awards was an event during which Adult Video News (AVN) presented its annual AVN Awards to honor the best pornographic movies and adult entertainment products of 2014 in the United States. The ceremony was held on January 24, 2015, at The Joint in the Hard Rock Hotel and Casino, Paradise, Nevada. The 32nd AVN Awards were co-hosted by Alexis Texas and Tommy Pistol.

24 XXX: An Axel Braun Parody won Best Parody, Best Screenplay-Parody, and Movie of the Year, with Axel Braun also winning Best Director-Parody, while Aftermath, which had the most nominations of any movie, won Best Drama, Best Screenplay, and Armstrong took home Best Director-Feature. The coveted Best New Starlet and Female Performer of the Year awards went to Carter Cruise and Anikka Albrite respectively. Albrite's husband, Mick Blue, won the Male Performer of the Year title. This marks the first time in the show's history that a married couple has simultaneously won both Performer of the Year awards.

The International Business Times found "a surprise: The Best Non-Feature Film award went to a female director, Mason, for Allie, although she was a no-show at the ceremony she also won Director of the Year.

A video featuring Tila Tequila won the award for Best Celebrity Sex Tape over videos featuring Farrah Abraham and Mimi Faust.

The awards show was recorded for its annual national broadcast on cable TV in the United States in mid-2015.

Winners and nominees
On August 27, 2014, the award categories for the 2015 ceremonies were announced. A change to the categories was announced in that VOD-only titles would be accepted according to certain eligibility requirements.

On November 20, 2014, the nominees for the 2015 awards were announced at an event in Hollywood which represented the first time that AVN Media Network had announced its nominees at a public event. According to the AVN staff, "AVN streamlined the categories for the 2015 AVN Awards with the aim of making it easier for studios, directors and performers to find the correct ways in which to nominate their work. Some redundancies were eliminated and categories that were too similar were in some cases merged to create a tight list of 108 categories."

Major awards

Winners of categories (listed in reverse order of presentation) announced during the awards ceremony January 24, 2015, are highlighted in boldface.

Additional award winners
The following is the list of remaining award categories, which were presented apart from the actual awards ceremony.

CONTENT CATEGORIES
 All-Girl Performer of the Year: Sinn Sage
 BBW Performer of the Year: April Flores
 Best All-Girl Group Sex Scene: Anikka Albrite, Dani Daniels & Karlie Montana, Anikka 2
 Best All-Girl Release: Alexis & Asa, and Women Seeking Women 100 (tie)
 Best All-Girl Series: Girls Kissing Girls
 Best Amateur Release: Dare Dorm 20
 Best Amateur/Pro-Am Series: Brand New Faces
 Best Anal Release: Ass Worship 15
 Best Anal Series: Wet Asses
 Best Art Direction: Apocalypse X
 Best BDSM Release: Brandy Aniston Is Fucked
 Best Big Bust Release: Bra Busters 5
 Best Big Butt Release: Wet Asses 4
 Best Celebrity Sex Tape: Tila Tequila 2: Backdoored & Squirting
 Best Cinematography: Billy Visual & Jakodema
 Best Comedy: Bikini Babes Are SharkBait
 Best Continuing Series: Oil Overload
 Best Director – Feature: Brad Armstrong, Aftermath
 Best Director – Foreign Feature: Herve Bodilis, Anissa Kate the Widow
 Best Director – Foreign Non-Feature: Gazzman, Young Harlots: Slutty Delinquents
 Best Director – Non-Feature: Mason, Allie
 Best Director – Parody: Axel Braun, 24 XXX: An Axel Braun Parody
 Best Double Penetration Sex Scene: Anikka Albrite, Mick Blue & Erik Everhard, Anikka 2
 Best Editing: Joey Pulgadas, Apocalypse X
 Best Ethnic Release: Latinas on Fire
 Best Ethnic/Interracial Series: Lex Turns Evil
 Best Foreign Feature: Anissa Kate the Widow
 Best Foreign Non-Feature: Anissa and Lola at Nurses’ School
 Best Group Sex Scene: A.J. Applegate, John Strong, Erik Everhard, Mr. Pete, Mick Blue, Ramón Nomar, James Deen & Jon Jon, Gangbang Me
 Best Interracial Release: Dani Daniels Deeper
 Best Makeup: Cammy Ellis, Anal Candy Disco Chicks
 Best Male Newcomer: Rob Piper
 Best Marketing Campaign – Company Image: Forbidden Fruits Films
 Best Marketing Campaign – Individual Project: Not Jersey Boys XXX: A Porn Musical, X-Play/Pulse
 Best MILF Release: Dirty Rotten Mother Fuckers 7
 Best Non-Feature: Flesh Hunter 12
 Best Non-Sex Performance: Christian Mann, Voracious: Season 2
 Best New Imprint: Airerose Entertainment
 Best New Series: Tabu Tales
 Best Older Woman/Younger Girl Release: Cougars, Kittens & Cock 3
 Best Oral Release: Wet Food 5
 Best Orgy/Gangbang Release: Gangbang Me
 Best POV Release: Lex’s Point of View
 Best POV Sex Scene: Phoenix Marie & Lexington Steele, Lex’s Point of View
 Best Pro-Am Release: Amateur POV Auditions 6
 Best Romance Movie: Second Chances
 Best Screenplay: Brad Armstrong, Aftermath
 Best Screenplay – Parody: Axel Braun & Eli Cross, 24 XXX: An Axel Braun Parody
 Best Solo/Tease Performance: Anikka Albrite, Dani Daniels & Karlie Montana, Anikka 2

Content (ctd.)
 Best Soundtrack: Not Jersey Boys XXX: A Porn Musical
 Best Special Effects: Austin Powers XXX: A Porn Parody
 Best Specialty Release – Other Genre: Bonnie Rotten Is Squirtwoman
 Best Specialty Series – Other Genre: Fetish Fanatic
 Best Supporting Actor: Xander Corvus, Holly…Would
 Best Taboo Relations Movie: Keep It in the Family
 Best Transsexual Release: TS Girlfriend Experience 3
 Best Transsexual Series: America’s Next Top Tranny
 Best Transsexual Sex Scene: Venus Lux & Dana Vespoli: TS, I Love You
 Best Three-Way Sex Scene – Boy/Boy/Girl: Allie Haze, Ramón Nomar & Mick Blue, Allie
 Best Three-Way Sex Scene – Girl/Girl/Boy: Dani Daniels, Anikka Albrite & Rob Piper, Dani Daniels Deeper
 Best Vignette Release: Erotico
 Best Young Girl Release: Super Cute
 Clever Title of the Year: 12 Inches a Slave
 Female Foreign Performer of the Year: Anissa Kate
 Mainstream Star of the Year: James Deen
 Male Foreign Performer of the Year: Rocco Siffredi
 MILF Performer of the Year: India Summer
 Most Outrageous Sex Scene: Adriana Chechik, Erik Everhard, James Deen & Mick Blue in “Two’s Company, Three’s a Crowd,” from Gangbang Me

Content (ctd.) - Fan Vote Awards
 Cutest Newcomer: August Ames
 Favorite Female Porn Star: Riley Steele
 Favorite Male Porn Star: James Deen
 Favorite Studio: Brazzers
 Favorite Web Cam Girl: Abella Anderson
 Hottest Ass: Alexis Texas
 Hottest MILF: Julia Ann
 Kinkiest Performer: Bonnie Rotten
 Social Media Star: Dani Daniels

WEB & TECHNOLOGY
 Best Affiliate Program: Gamma Entertainment
 Best Alternative Website: Clips4Sale.com
 Best Dating Website: AshleyMadison.com
 Best Glamour Website: SexArt.com
 Best Live Chat Website: ImLive.com
 Best Membership Website: Brazzers.com
 Best Porn Star Website: JoannaAngel.com
 Best Solo Girl Website: AaliyahLove.com
 Best Web Director: Lee Roy Myers

PLEASURE PRODUCTS
 Best Condom Manufacturer: Lifestyles
 Best Enhancement Manufacturer: Evolved Novelties
 Best Fetish Manufacturer: CB-X
 Best Lingerie or Apparel Manufacturer: Coquette
 Best Lubricant Manufacturer: Wet International
 Best Pleasure Product Manufacturer – Small: njoy
 Best Pleasure Product Manufacturer – Medium: Impulse Novelties
 Best Pleasure Product Manufacturer – Large: California Exotic Novelties
 Best Product Line for Men: Fleshlight Girls
 Best Product Line for Women: The Girls

RETAIL & DISTRIBUTION
 Best Boutique: The Stockroom/Syren (Los Angeles)
 Best Retail Chain – Small: The Pleasure Chest
 Best Retail Chain – Large: Castle Megastore
 Best Web Retail Store: AdamAndEve.com

Honorary AVN Awards

Hall of Fame
On December 24, 2014, the AVN Hall of Fame class of 2015 was announced with 27 inductees added. Inductees were honored at an industry cocktail party at the AVN Adult Entertainment Expo three days prior to the awards show.

The AVN Hall of Fame inductees for 2015, “a mix of high achievers who have given something to the various sectors of our industry,” are as follows:
 Founders Branch: Al Goldstein, Marc Dorcel
 Video Branch: Eli Cross, Alana Evans, Billy Glide, Porno Dan Leal, Kaylani Lei, Joanna Jet, Kelly Madison, Andre Madness, Craven Moorehead, Wesley Pipes, RayVeness, Will Ryder, Karen Summer, Talon, Tim Von Swine
 Executive Branch: Marci Hirsch, Bonnie Kail, Howard Levine, Dan O’Connell
 Pleasure Products Branch: Joe Bolstad, Pavle Sedic, Ari Suss
 Internet Branch: Steve Lightspeed, Lensman, Botto Brothers

Films with multiple nominations

The following 15 films received 10 or more nominations:

Individuals with multiple nominations

The following 17 performers and directors received eight or more nominations:

Presenters and Performers
The following individuals were presenters or performers during the awards ceremony:

Presenters

 Actresses Brooklyn Chase, August Ames, Scarlet Red, Adriana Chechik, A.J. Applegate, Abigail Mac, Nadia Styles, Asa Akira, Mia Malkova, Karmen Karma, Aiden Starr, Christie Stevens, Jessica Drake, Veruca James, Gabriella Paltrova, Allie Haze, Jesse Jane, Jodi West, Kelly des Ch'tis, Farrah Abraham, Skin Diamond, Maddy O'Reilly, Brandy Aniston, Amber Lynn, Sunny Megatron
 A bevy of Penthouse Pets: Lexi Belle, Misty Stone, Ryan Ryans, Kenna James, Layla Sin
 Actors Ron Jeremy, Ryan Driller, Tommy Gunn, Lexington Steele, Michael Vegas

Trophy girls

 Carmen Caliente
 Jillian Janson

Performers

Ceremony information

In order to be eligible for the 2015 award nomination, a movie or product had to be released in accordance with the following guidelines:
 To be considered, a title must have been released between October 8, 2013, and September 30, 2014, either via VOD (video on demand) or DVD
 Titles released on DVD must fit AVN's traditional distribution requirements of being stocked with five wholesale distributors and/or 100 retail outlets
 Titles released on VOD must have been made available during the eligibility period for VOD download and/or streaming through at least two (2) major, for-pay VOD providers, defined as ones carrying movies from at least 100 active labels/studios
 The title must have clearly marked post dates falling within the eligibility period across all qualifying VOD platforms carrying it

On May 12, 2014, it was announced that Alexis Texas and Tommy Pistol were to be the co-hosts for the ceremonies. This was the first time in twenty years that a male performer was a host at the awards. Previously, AVN Hall of Fame inductee Steven St. Croix was a host in 1995, preceded by Randy West, Tom Byron and Rick Savage. On November 25, 2014, comedian and actress Danielle Stewart was added to the team as the comedic co-host for the show.

Changes to awards categories

For 2015, AVN decided "to expand its longstanding eligibility requirements ... to include ones distributed solely via video-on-demand."

AVN also announced, "Some redundancies were eliminated and categories that were too similar were in some cases merged together to create a tight list of 108 categories."

Additionally, a new "surprise category" was announced, Best Taboo Relations Movie.

Controversies

The Internet Adult Film Database staff believes it has found a couple of mistakes in the nomination list issued by AVN: "In the Best POV Sex Scene category, the editors got their volume numbers jumbled – the  scene between Summer Brielle and Kevin Moore appeared in Tease Me POV, not Tease Me POV 2. And performers got crossed with the Best Sex Scene in a Foreign-Shot Production category. The scene from Russian Institute: Lesson 19: Holidays at My Parents isn’t between Ariel Rebel and Lola Reve, it’s between Ariel Rebel and Cayenne Klein."

Reception and review

Some media outlets were impressed by the show. The International Business Times said, "The evening also was filled with surprisingly entertaining repartee between presenters, funny pre-filmed skits and an overall sense of irony about the event." It also noted, "One significant way the AVN awards differs from the Oscars is in the brevity of the acceptance speeches. Most winners thanked agents and other performers in less than 30 seconds before leaving the stage. A couple gave nods to their mothers."

CraveOnline Canada said, "The AVN Awards are as good a time to demand this call to arms as any. Pornography is a popular, widespread artistic genre – whatever you may or may not think of it – and it warrants more thoughtful consideration than whether or not it works as a product, or whether or not it is empowering us or destroying our values."

In Memoriam
As the show was beginning, AVN used a video segment to pay a tribute to adult-industry personalities who had died since the 2014 awards show:
 Golden-age hall of fame actress Gloria Leonard
 Evil Angel general manager Christian Mann
 Hot Vidéo founder Franck Vardon
 Tony Lovett, a former editor-in-chief of three different AVN Media Network publications
 Something Weird Video founder Mike Vraney
 Photographer Bunny Yeager
 and Toby Dammit, Cameron Fox, Billy Glide, Heather Joy, Christine Kessler, Armando Malatesta, Jake Malone, Phil Marshak, Shoosh, Paul Snell, Southern Somer and Jim Steel

See also

 AVN Awards
 AVN Award for Male Performer of the Year
 AVN Female Performer of the Year Award
 AVN Award for Male Foreign Performer of the Year
 List of members of the AVN Hall of Fame
 87th Academy Awards

Notes

External links
 Adult Video News
 Adult Video News Awards at the Internet Movie Database

AVN Awards
AVN Awards 32